John Mitchell Purves  (2 August 1847 – 17 September 1915) was an Australian politician.

Earliy life
He was born at Port Macquarie to Presbyterian clergyman Reverend William Purves and Alison Inglis Adams. He attended the University of Sydney from 1866 to 1872, receiving a Bachelor of Arts and a Master of Arts. From 1870 to 1871 he went to England, and on his return he settled in the Clarence River district. On 27 November 1873 he married Annie Georgina Metcalfe, with whom he had three children.

Political career
In 1880, he was elected to the New South Wales Legislative Assembly for Clarence, serving until his defeat in 1887. A real estate agent, he also served as a North Sydney alderman and several terms as mayor.

Later life
Purves died at Woollahra in 1915.

References

 

1847 births
1915 deaths
Members of the New South Wales Legislative Assembly
University of Sydney alumni
Australian real estate agents
Mayors of North Sydney
19th-century Australian businesspeople